Chalybeate Springs (sometimes simply Chalybeate) is an unincorporated community located in the Hector's Creek Township of Harnett County, North Carolina, United States. It is a part of the Dunn Micropolitan Area, which is also a part of the greater Raleigh–Durham–Cary Combined Statistical Area (CSA) as defined by the United States Census Bureau.

The community was first settled in 1760 and was named for the nearby springs containing iron salts, around which developed an early health resort .  The community was formally laid out as a  town in 1902 along the Raleigh and Cape Fear Railway , which is now part of the Norfolk Southern Railway.
Chalybeate Springs was the childhood home of Elizabeth Holt,  who became a famous public advocate and ultimately moved to the Raleigh-Durham area.  The Holts were a prosperous farming family in the Chalybeate Springs area.

References

 
 
 http://www.harnett.org/LIBRARY/Quilt/Quilt%20Squares/chalybeate%20springs.htm

Unincorporated communities in Harnett County, North Carolina
Unincorporated communities in North Carolina
Populated places established in 1760